Mesalina saudiarabica is a species of sand-dwelling lizard in the family Lacertidae. The species is endemic to Saudi Arabia.

References

saudiarabica
Reptiles described in 2017
Taxa named by Jiří Moravec (herpetologist)
Taxa named by Jiří Šmíd
Taxa named by Andreas Schmitz
Taxa named by Mohammed Shobrak
Taxa named by Thomas Wilms